The Waddell Barnes Botanical Gardens are botanical gardens located on the campus of Middle Georgia State University, Macon, Georgia, spanning . They are open daily without charge.

The gardens were established in 1967 to designs of landscape architect Clay Adamson when the construction of Macon Junior College began. Initial planting consisted of more than 1,600 trees, 2,500 shrubs, and 12,000 ground cover plants. Thirty years later, Dr. Waddell Barnes, chair of trustees, led the effort to create botanical gardens across campus to a master plan by Robert and Company. In 2003 the gardens were named in Dr. Barnes' honor.

Today the campus is divided into 16 gardens: Asian, European, Fall Colors, Fragrant, Fruit Trees, Industry, Medicinal, Natives, Showy Flowers, Showy Fruit, Shrubs and Vines, Southern Traditional, Touch & Feel, Urban Environment, Wet Environment, and Xeriscape.

See also 
 List of botanical gardens in the United States

External links 
Waddell Barnes Botanical Gardens

Botanical gardens in Georgia (U.S. state)
Protected areas of Bibb County, Georgia
Tourist attractions in Macon, Georgia